Gordon Hugh East (July 7, 1919 – November 2, 1981) was a pitcher in Major League Baseball. He played for the New York Giants. From 1943 to 1945 East served in the Navy during World War II.

References

External links

1919 births
1981 deaths
Major League Baseball pitchers
New York Giants (NL) players
Boston Red Sox scouts
Detroit Tigers scouts
San Francisco Giants scouts
Baseball players from Birmingham, Alabama
United States Navy personnel of World War II